The National Crime Syndicate was the name given by the press to the multi-ethnic, closely connected, American confederation of several criminal organizations. It mostly consisted of and was led by the closely interconnected Italian-American Mafia and Jewish mob; to a lesser extent, it also involved other criminal organizations such as the Irish Mob and African-American organized crime groups. Hundreds of murders were committed by Murder, Inc. on behalf of the National Crime Syndicate during the 1930s and 1940s.

History
According to writers on organized crime, the Syndicate was an idea of Johnny Torrio, and was founded or established at a May 1929 conference in Atlantic City. It was attended by leading underworld figures throughout the United States, including  Torrio, Lucky Luciano, Al Capone, Benjamin "Bugsy" Siegel, Frank Costello, Joe Adonis, Dutch Schultz, Abner "Longie" Zwillman, Louis "Lepke" Buchalter, Gambino crime family head Vincent Mangano,  Atlantic City Crime Syndicate boss Nucky Johnson, gambler Frank Erickson, Frank Scalice, and Albert "the Mad Hatter" Anastasia. Others described the Atlantic City meeting as a coordination and strategy conference for bootleggers. According to the findings of the United States Senate Special Committee in the 1950s, chaired by Estes Kefauver, the National Crime Syndicate was a confederation of mainly Italian and Jewish organized crime groups throughout the United States.

The media dubbed the enforcement arm of the Syndicate "Murder, Inc.", a gang of Brooklyn mafiosi who carried out murders in the 1930s and 1940s for various crime bosses. It was headed by Buchalter and Anastasia, who reported to commission members Lansky and Adonis, and included many infamous mobsters. 

Murder Inc. consisted of two factions. One was the Jewish Brownsville Boys headed by Abe "Kid Twist" Reles, who reported to Lepke Buchalter and Jacob "Gurrah" Shapiro. The other was the Italian Ocean Hill Hooligans led by Harry "Happy" Maione, who reported to Albert Anastasia. Bugsy Siegel was involved in many of Murder Incorporated's murders, but as a leading figure instead of a soldier.

In his biography of Meyer Lansky, Little Man (1991), journalist Robert Lacey argued that no National Crime Syndicate ever existed. "The idea of a National Crime Syndicate is often confused with the Mafia. Yet they are not the same thing," probably referring to the American Mafia.

Although many of its members were imprisoned, and some were executed, the demise of the organization is as uncertain as its origins. By the late 1940s, Murder Inc. and most of its non-Italian components were defunct. Some individuals, such as Lansky, continued to operate as affiliates of Italian groups.

See also
 American Mafia
 The Commission (American Mafia)
 Jewish-American organized crime

Bibliography

References

Organizations established in 1929
1929 establishments in New Jersey
Organizations disestablished in the 1960s
Italian-American organized crime groups
Jewish-American organized crime groups
American Mafia
Lucky Luciano
Meyer Lansky